The men's keirin at the 2006 Dutch National Track Championships in Alkmaar took place at Sportpaleis Alkmaar on December 28, 2006.

Theo Bos won the gold medal, Teun Mulder took silver and Patrick Bos won the bronze.

Final results (top 12)

References

2006 Dutch National track cycling championships
Dutch National Track Championships – Men's keirin